The Vuelta a España is an annual road bicycle race currently held over 23 days in August and September. Up until the 1995 edition the race was held during April and May. Established in 1935, the Vuelta is one of the most well-known and prestigious of cycling's three "Grand Tours"; the others are the Tour de France and the Giro d'Italia. The race usually passes through Spain and neighboring countries. The race is broken into day-long segments, called stages. Individual finishing times for each stage are totaled to determine the overall winner at the end of the race.

Host cities

See also
List of Vuelta a España classification winners
Red jersey statistics
List of Grand Tour general classification winners

References

Footnotes

Citations

Gran Partidas